Donald William Awrey (born July 18, 1943) is a Canadian former professional hockey defenceman. He played 979 career National Hockey League (NHL) games with the Boston Bruins, St. Louis Blues, Montreal Canadiens, Pittsburgh Penguins, New York Rangers, and Colorado Rockies.

He overcame a back injury while attending high school after surgery to fuse three vertebrae and being confined to a Stryker frame for three weeks.

A defensive defenceman, known for his superb shot-blocking and bone-jarring bodychecks, Awrey played for the Niagara Falls Flyers of the OHA before being signed by the Bruins. Despite being an exceptionally fast skater, he rarely scored goals. He made his NHL debut in 1963–64 for the Bruins, his first of 16 seasons in the league. Awrey scored his first NHL goal on March 16, 1964 in Boston's 3-1 home win over Montreal.

Awrey was part of two Stanley Cup winning teams with the Bruins, in 1970 and 1972. He was also part of the Montreal Canadiens team that won the Stanley Cup in 1976, but did not play in any playoff games that season, and so does not have his name engraved on the cup for that year even though he qualified. Awrey was named to Team Canada for the Summit Series, playing in two of the eight games.

Awrey was acquired by the Canadiens from the Blues for Chuck Lefley on November 28, 1974. He was dealt from the Canadiens to the Penguins for a third-round selection in the 1978 NHL Amateur Draft (42nd overall–Richard David) and cash on August 11, 1976. His last season in the NHL was 1978–79, when he played for the Colorado Rockies. He now lives in Fort Myers, Florida.

Career statistics

Regular season and playoffs

International

References

External links

1943 births
Living people
Boston Bruins players
Canadian ice hockey defencemen
Colorado Rockies (NHL) players
Ice hockey people from Ontario
Sportspeople from Kitchener, Ontario
Montreal Canadiens players
Niagara Falls Flyers (1960–1972) players
New York Rangers players
Pittsburgh Penguins players
St. Louis Blues players
Stanley Cup champions